Sir Peter Alderidge Williams  (1 December 1934 – 9 June 2015) was a New Zealand barrister and penal reform advocate. He was appointed a Queen's Counsel in 1987.

Biography 
Williams was born in 1934 and educated at Feilding High School. He graduated from the University of New Zealand at Auckland in 1960. A noted defence lawyer, Williams represented high-profile clients including Terry Clark, Ronald Jorgensen, Arapeta Awatere and Winston Peters, and was involved in having the conviction of Arthur Allan Thomas for the murders of Harvey and Jeannette Crewe overturned. During his 60-year career, he appeared in over 100 murder trials. 

Williams was a long-time advocate for the humane treatment of prisoners in New Zealand, and served as the head of the New Zealand Howard League for Penal Reform. He was the foundation president of the NZ Criminal Bar Association.

Williams was appointed a Queen's Counsel in 1987. In 1990, he was awarded the New Zealand 1990 Commemoration Medal, and in the 2015 New Year Honours Williams was appointed a Knight Companion of the New Zealand Order of Merit for services to the law. A private investiture was held at his home on 11 April 2015, as it was feared he might not live until the scheduled investiture on 6 May 2015 at Government House in Auckland. He died from prostate cancer at his home in the Auckland suburb of Ponsonby on 9 June 2015, survived by his wife, Lady Heeni Phillips-Williams.

Published works
Williams wrote a number of books including:

References

1934 births
2015 deaths
People educated at Feilding High School
University of Auckland alumni
20th-century New Zealand lawyers
New Zealand King's Counsel
Prison reformers
Knights Companion of the New Zealand Order of Merit
Deaths from cancer in New Zealand
Deaths from prostate cancer
People from Ohakune